Diocese of Jalingo may refer to:

Anglican Diocese of Jalingo
Roman Catholic Diocese of Jalingo